The Pennsylvania Gazette was one of the United States' most prominent newspapers from 1728 until 1800. In the several years leading up to the American Revolution the paper served as a voice for colonial opposition to British colonial rule, especially as it related to the Stamp Act, and the Townshend Acts.

History

The newspaper was first published in 1728 by Samuel Keimer and was the second newspaper to be published in Pennsylvania under the name The Universal Instructor in all Arts and Sciences: and Pennsylvania Gazette, alluding to Keimer's intention to print out a page of Ephraim Chambers' Cyclopaedia, or Universal Dictionary of Arts and Sciences in each copy.

On October 2, 1729,  Samuel Keimer, the owner of the Gazette, fell into debt and before fleeing to Barbados sold the newspaper to Benjamin Franklin and his partner Hugh Meredith, who shortened its name, as well as dropping Keimer's grandiose plan to print out the Cyclopaedia. Franklin not only printed the paper but also often contributed pieces to the paper under aliases. His newspaper soon became the most successful in the colonies.

On December 28, 1732, Franklin announced in Gazette that he had just printed and published the first edition of The Poor Richard, (better known as Poor Richard's Almanack) by Richard Saunders, Philomath. On August 6, 1741 Franklin published an editorial about deceased Andrew Hamilton, a lawyer and public figure in Philadelphia who had been a friend. The editorial praised the man highly and showed Franklin had held the man in high esteem.

On October 19, 1752, Franklin published a third-person account of his pioneering kite experiment in The Pennsylvania Gazette, without mentioning that he himself had performed it.

Primarily a publication for classified ads, merchants and individuals listed notices of employment, lost and found goods and items for sale; the newspaper also reprinted foreign news. Most entries involved stories of travel. The gazette also published advertisements for runaway slaves and indentured servants.

This newspaper, among other firsts, would print the first political cartoon in America, Join, or Die, authored by Franklin.

The paper ceased publication in 1800, ten years after Franklin's death. It is claimed that the publication later reemerged as the Saturday Evening Post in 1821.

There are three known copies of the original issue, which are held by the Historical Society of Pennsylvania, the Library Company of Philadelphia, and the Wisconsin State Historical Society.

Today, The Pennsylvania Gazette moniker is used by an unrelated bi-monthly alumni magazine of the University of Pennsylvania, which Franklin founded and served as a trustee.

See also
 Early American publishers and printers
 Pennsylvania Chronicle
 The Constitutional Post
 Join, or Die
 Liberty's Kids
 The Drinker's Dictionary

References

Sources

External links
 

Defunct newspapers of Philadelphia
Publications established in 1728
Publications disestablished in 1800
1728 establishments in Pennsylvania
Newspapers of colonial America